Back to the Story is a compilation box set by Sixties band The Idle Race released in 1996 on EMI's short-lived "Premier" series. It contains all three official studio albums and non-album singles and B-sides. The original CD featured the earliest known tracks featuring Jeff Lynne in The Nightriders but it quickly went out of print. In 2007, the set was re-released on EMI's newly reconstituted "Zonophone" label minus the Nightriders tracks.

Tracks

CD One
(The Birthday Party)
 The Skeleton And The Roundabout
 Happy Birthday
 The Birthday
 I Like My Toys
 Morning Sunshine
 Follow Me Follow
 Sitting In My Tree (mono)
 On With The Show
 Lucky Man
 (Don't Put Your Boys In The Army) Mrs. Ward
 Pie In The Sky
 The Lady who Said She Could Fly
 End Of The Road
(Idle Race)
 Come With Me (rechanneled to simulate stereo)
 Sea Of Dreams
 Going Home
 Reminds Me Of You
 Mr. Crow and Sir Norman
 Please No More Sad Songs
 Girl At The Window
 Big Chief Woolley Bosher
 Someone Knocking
 A Better Life (The Weather Man Knows)
 Hurry Up John
Alternative Versions
 Lucky Man (mono)
 Follow Me Follow (mono)
 Days Of Broken Arrows (mono)

CD Two
(Non-album Tracks)
 (Here We Go 'Round) The Lemon Tree (mono)
 My Father's Son (mono)
 Imposters Of Life's Magazine (mono)
 Knocking Nails Into My House (mono)
 Days Of The Broken Arrows (mono)
 Worn Red Carpet (mono)
 In The Summertime
 Told You Twice
 Neanderthal Man (rechanneled to simulate stereo)
 Victim Of Circumstance (rechanneled to simulate stereo)
(Time Is)
 Dancing Flower
 Sad O'Sad
 The Clock
 I Will See You
 By The Sun
 Alcatraz
 And The Rain
 She Sang Hymns Out Of Tune
 Bitter Green
 We Want It All

 21. It's Only the Dog (mono)
 22. Your Friend   (mono)
These last two tracks by The Nightriders appear only on the original 1996 release

1996 compilation albums
Albums produced by Eddy Offord
Albums produced by Jeff Lynne